Madrid Carnival (Spanish:Verbena) is a 1941 Spanish semi-documentary drama film directed by Edgar Neville.

Plot

Cast
 Maruja Tomás  
 Amalia de Isaura 
 Miguel Pozanco    
 Manuel Dicenta  
 José Martín 
 Manolo Morán   
 Ana María Quijada  
 Miguel Utrillo    
 Juan Monfort
 José María Lado

References

Bibliography
 Bentley, Bernard. A Companion to Spanish Cinema. Boydell & Brewer 2008.

External links 

1941 films
Spanish drama films
Spanish documentary films
1941 drama films
1941 documentary films
Black-and-white documentary films
1940s Spanish-language films
Films directed by Edgar Neville
Spanish black-and-white films
1940s Spanish films